Gregg Schmedes is an American physician and politician serving as a member of the New Mexico Senate from the 19th district. He previously served as a member of the New Mexico House of Representatives from the 22nd district, which includes portions of Bernalillo, Sandoval, and Santa Fe counties.

Early life and education 
Schmedes was born and raised in Texas. He earned a Bachelor of Science in electrical engineering from the University of Texas at Austin and Doctor of Medicine from the Texas Tech University Health Sciences Center.

Career 
In addition to serving in the New Mexico House of Representatives, Schmedes has also worked as an assistant professor of surgery at the University of New Mexico Hospital. He also serves as New Mexico’s director for the American Academy of Medical Ethics. Schmedes was elected to the New Mexico House in 2018. In 2020, Schmedes announced that he would not seek re-election and instead run for New Mexico Senate. He won the November general election, defeating incumbent Republican James White. He assumed office on January 19, 2021.

Personal life 
Schmedes and his wife, Kelley, have seven children.

References 

Republican Party members of the New Mexico House of Representatives
American surgeons
Physicians from Texas
Physicians from New Mexico
University of Texas at Austin alumni
Texas Tech University Health Sciences Center alumni
Living people
Year of birth missing (living people)
21st-century American physicians
21st-century American politicians
21st-century surgeons